Gary Hannam (born 1951 in Whangārei) is a New Zealand film producer. He co-produced The World's Fastest Indian among other films. He has also played a role in the Olivado Limited avocado oil company and served as its chief executive officer.

References 

New Zealand chief executives
New Zealand film producers
People from Whangārei
1951 births
Living people